Wendell Meredith Stanley (16 August 1904 – 15 June 1971)  was an American biochemist, virologist and Nobel laureate.

Biography
Stanley was born in Ridgeville, Indiana, and earned a BSc in Chemistry at Earlham College in Richmond, Indiana.  He then studied at the University of Illinois, gaining an MS in science in 1927 followed by a PhD in chemistry two years later.  His later accomplishments include writing the book "Chemistry: A Beautiful Thing" and being a Pulitzer Prize nominee.

Research
As a member of National Research Council he moved temporarily for academic work with Heinrich Wieland in Munich before he returned to the States in 1931. On return he was approved as an assistant at The Rockefeller Institute for Medical Research. He remained with the Institute until 1948, becoming an Associate Member in 1937, and a Member in 1940. In 1948, he became Professor of Biochemistry at the University of California, Berkeley and built the Virus Laboratory and a free-standing Department of Biochemistry building, which is now called Stanley Hall.

His research on the virus causing the mosaic disease in tobacco plants led to the isolation of a nucleoprotein which displayed tobacco mosaic virus activity.

Stanley was awarded the Nobel Prize in Chemistry for 1946. His other notable awards included the Rosenburger Medal, Alder Prize, Scott Award, the Golden Plate Award of the American Academy of Achievement and the AMA Scientific Achievement Award. He was also awarded honorary degrees by many universities both American and foreign, including Harvard, Yale, Princeton and the University of Paris. Most of the conclusions Stanley had presented in his Nobel-winning research were soon shown to be incorrect (in particular, that the crystals of mosaic virus he had isolated were pure protein, and assembled by autocatalysis).

Personal life
Stanley married Marian Staples (1905–1984) in 1929 and had three daughters (Marjorie, Dorothy and Janet) and a son (Wendell Meredith Junior). Stanley Hall at UC Berkeley (now Stanley Biosciences and Bioengineering Facility) and Stanley Hall at Earlham College are named in his honor. His daughter, Marjorie, married Dr. Robert Albo, physician to the Golden State Warriors basketball team as well as the Oakland Raiders football team.

References

External links

  including the Nobel Lecture on December 12, 1946 The Isolation and Properties of Crystalline Tobacco Mosaic Virus
Wendell Meredith Stanley and the birth of biochemistry at UC Berkeley
Guide to the Wendell M. Stanley Papers at The Bancroft Library

1904 births
1971 deaths
American biochemists
American Nobel laureates
Earlham College alumni
Nobel laureates in Chemistry
People from Richmond, Indiana
University of California, Berkeley faculty
University of Illinois Urbana-Champaign alumni
American virologists
Members of the United States National Academy of Sciences
Proceedings of the National Academy of Sciences of the United States of America editors